Kjetil Wæhler (born 16 March 1976 in Oslo) is a Norwegian footballer who plays as a centre back.

Wæhler is currently without a club.

International career
As of December 2013, Kjetil Wæhler has been capped 32 times for Norway, scoring one goal. He made his debut against Switzerland on 17 August 2005. 
His first, and so far only, international goal came against South Africa, in a friendly match on 10 October 2009, a game Norway won 1–0.

Career statistics

Club

International

International goals

Honours

Club
FK Lyn
Norwegian First Division: 1996

Vålerenga
Tippeligaen: 2005
Norwegian Football Cup: 2008

IFK Göteborg
Svenska Cupen: 2012–13

References

External links
AaB profile
National team profile

1976 births
Living people
Norwegian footballers
Norway international footballers
Norway under-21 international footballers
Lyn Fotball players
Wimbledon F.C. players
Moss FK players
Vålerenga Fotball players
AaB Fodbold players
IFK Göteborg players
Eliteserien players
Norwegian First Division players
Danish Superliga players
Allsvenskan players
Norwegian expatriate footballers
Expatriate footballers in England
Expatriate men's footballers in Denmark
Expatriate footballers in Sweden
Norwegian expatriate sportspeople in England
Norwegian expatriate sportspeople in Denmark
Norwegian expatriate sportspeople in Sweden

Association football defenders
Footballers from Oslo